List of notable people who were born, raised, or lived in Baton Rouge, Louisiana at some point in their life.

Sports figures

 Seimone Augustus, former WNBA player who is currently an assistant coach for the Los Angeles Sparks (b. 1984) 
Frank Bartley, basketball player for Pallacanestro Trieste of the Lega Basket Serie A (b. 1994)
 Brandon Bass, NBA power forward (b. 1985) 
 Billy Cannon, former All-American and 1959 Heisman Trophy winner (b. 1937) 
 Michael Clayton, former NFL wide receiver (b. 1982) 
 Willie Davenport, Olympics gold medal winner 
Brad Davis, College Football Coach (b. 1980) 
 Glen Davis, NBA forward for the Los Angeles Clippers (b. 1986) 
 David Dellucci, MLB outfielder for the Cleveland Indians (b. 1973) 
 Warrick Dunn, NFL running back for the Tampa Bay Buccaneers (b. 1975) 
 Chad Durbin, MLB pitcher for the Cleveland Indians (b. 1977) 
 Alan Faneca, NFL guard for the Pittsburgh Steelers (b. 1976)
 Langston Galloway, NBA G League player for the College Park Skyhawks (b. 1991)
 Randall Gay, NFL cornerback for the New Orleans Saints (b. 1982) 
 Stephen Gostkowski, American football placekicker
 Darryl Hamilton, MLB outfielder for various clubs (b. 1964) 
Jeremy Hill, NFL running back for the New England Patriots
 Russ Johnson, major league infielder (b. 1973) 
 Lolo Jones, track and field athlete 
 Victor Jones, NFL player
 Stefan LeFors, former quarterback in American and Canadian football 
 Norman LeJeune, NFL former football safety 
 Donnie Lewis, NFL Player
 Pete Maravich, LSU and NBA player in Basketball Hall of Fame
 Jarell Martin (born 1994), American basketball player for Maccabi Tel Aviv of the Israeli Basketball Premier League 
 Skylar Mays, NBA player for the Atlanta Hawks (b. 1997)
 Todd McClure, former NFL offensive lineman for Atlanta Falcons (b. 1977) 
Jerome Meyinsse (b. 1988), basketball player in the Israeli Basketball Premier League
Rod Milburn (b. 1976), Olympic gold medalist
 Travis Minor, NFL running back, St. Louis Rams
Yohanan Moyal (b. 1965), Israeli Olympic gymnast
 Buddy Myer, MLB 2-time All-Star second baseman, batting and stolen base titles 
Aaron Nola, MLB All Star baseball pitcher (b. 1993)
 Jonathan Papelbon, MLB pitcher for the Boston Red Sox (b. 1980) 
 Carly Patterson, Olympic gold medalist (b. 1988)
 Bob Pettit, Basketball Hall of Famer (b. 1932) 
 Andy Pettitte, MLB pitcher for the New York Yankees (b. 1972) 
 Bobby Phills, former professional basketball player (d. 2000) 
 Pat Screen, former LSU quarterback, Mayor-President of East Baton Rouge Parish from 1981 to 1988  (1943–1994) 
 Ben Sheets, MLB pitcher for the Milwaukee Brewers (b. 1978) 
 Marcus Spears, NFL defensive end for the Dallas Cowboys (b. 1982) 
 Jim Taylor, Football Hall of Famer (b. 1935) 
 Tyrus Thomas, NBA forward for the Chicago Bulls (b. 1986) 
 Reggie Tongue, NFL safety for the Kansas City Chiefs, Seattle Seahawks, New York Jets, and Oakland Raiders
 Reggie Torbor, NFL linebacker for the Miami Dolphins
 Jimmy Williams, NFL cornerback who graduated from Vanderbilt University and played for the Houston Texans
Johnathan Stove, basketball player for Hapoel Galil Elyon of the Israeli Basketball Premier League (b. 1995)
 Joe Williams, NFL player
 Kevin Windham, professional motocross racer 
Walter Williams, NFL player

Entertainers
 Boosie Badazz, rap artist (b. 1982)
 Wes Brown, actor, We Are Marshall, Glory Road, Beach Girls
 Andrei Codrescu, writer
 Bill Conti, conductor and composer
 Stormy Daniels, porn star and porn director (b. 1979)
 Trent Dawson, actor, As the World Turns (b. 1971)
 Donna Douglas, actress, The Beverly Hillbillies (1933-2015) 
 Louis Edmonds, actor, All My Children
 Wesley Eure, actor, author 
 Foxx, rap artist
 John Fred, singer, best known for the song "Judy in Disguise (With Glasses)" (1941-2005)
 Fredo Bang, rap artist
 Larry Garner, blues guitarist
 Kevin Gates, rap artist
 Jiminy Glick, Hollywood socialite and former host of Primetime Glick
 Dale Houston, singer, best known for the song "I'm Leaving It Up To You" (1940-2007)
 Randy Jackson, musician, record producer, and American Idol judge (b. 1956)
 Chris Thomas King, blues musician and actor (b. 1962)
 David Lambert, actor (b. 1992)
 Don Lemon, CNN TV personality and host of CNN Tonight (b. 1966)
 Lil Phat, rap artist
 Jonathon "Boogie" Long, blues rock musician
 Master P, rap artist
 Rod Masterson, actor (1945–2013)
 Reiley McClendon, actor (b. 1990)
 John McConnell, actor, radio personality (b. 1958)
 Casey McQuiston, author of NYT Bestseller, "Red, White, and Royal Blue"
 Cleo Moore, actress (d. 1973)
 Elemore Morgan Jr., landscape painter and photographer (b. 1931)
 James Paul, Conductor Emeritus of the Baton Rouge Symphony (b. 1940)
 Cameron Richardson, actress, Open Water 2: Adrift (b. 1979)
 Percy Sledge, singer, "When a Man Loves a Woman"
 Slim Harpo, blues musician
 Steven Soderbergh, director
 Tabby Thomas, blues musician and club owner (b. 1929)
 Pruitt Taylor Vince, actor (b. 1960)
 Rosalie "Lady Tamborine" Washington, gospel musician and tambourine player (b. 1957)
 Webbie, rap artist (b. 1985)
 Shane West, actor (b. 1978)
 Lynn Whitfield, actress
 YoungBoy Never Broke Again, rap artist

Politicians
 Larry S. Bankston, lawyer and former state senator, son of Jesse Bankston, D (b. 1951)
 Regina Barrow (b. 1966), member of the Louisiana State Senate, former state representative for East and West Baton Rouge parishes, 2005-2016
 V.J. Bella (b. 1927), former state representative from St. Mary Parish and state fire marshal, based in Baton Rouge, 1990–1992 and 1996–2004, R 
Sherman A. Bernard (1925-2012), state insurance commissioner from 1972 to 1988; convicted felon, D
 Morton Blackwell (b. 1939), political activist in Louisiana and later Virginia, R
 Mike Branch (b. 1968), state senator and commercial pilot, later of Las Vegas, Nevada, R
 Overton Brooks (1897-1961), U.S. representative from 1937 to 1961, representing Louisiana's 4th congressional district based about Shreveport, was born in Baton Rouge, D 
Chad M. Brown, member of the Louisiana House of Representatives for Iberville and Assumption parishes, effective January 2016, lives in Plaquemine, former Baton Rouge resident
 H. Rap Brown, African American activist imprisoned in Georgia 
George A. Caldwell, contractor who supervised the construction of twenty-six public buildings in Louisiana; imprisoned in the "Louisiana Hayride" scandals of 1939–1940, D
Barbara West Carpenter (b. 1943), dean of international relations at Southern University and African-American Democrat state representative from District 63 in East Baton Rouge Parish since 2016
Sally Clausen (b. 1945), former university president and commissioner of Louisiana higher education, retired in Baton Rouge
 Thomas G. Clausen (1939-2002), last person to be elected to the since appointed position of Louisiana education superintendent; St. Mary Parish native and Baton Rouge resident
 Luther F. Cole (1925-2013), legislator, judge, state Supreme Court associate justice, D 
 Paula Davis (b. 1973), state representative for District 69 in East Baton Rouge Parish since 2015
William J. "Bill" Dodd (1909-1991), state representative, lieutenant governor, state auditor, member of Louisiana Board of Education, state education superintendent, D
Gil Dozier, Louisiana agriculture commissioner from 1976 to 1980; convicted felon, D
Rick Edmonds, state representative for District 66 in East Baton Rouge Parish since 2016, R
 Mike Edmonson, superintendent of the Louisiana State Police since 2008, R
 Ronnie Edwards (c. 1952–2016), member of the Baton Rouge Metro Council and the Louisiana House of Representatives in January and February 2016, D 
 Jimmy Field, Louisiana Public Service Commissioner (1996-2012), R 
Jeff Fortenberry, U.S. representative from Nebraska (b. 1960), R
 Mike Futrell, former state representative and Metro Council member, R 
 William H. Gray (1941-2013), U.S. representative from Philadelphia, Pennsylvania, born in Baton Rouge, first African American to serve as a House majority whip, D 
 Douglas D. "Doug" Green (b. c. 1950), state insurance commissioner, 1988–1991; convicted felon, D
Anthony Guarisco Jr. (b. 1938), former state senator from Morgan City; lawyer, formerly practiced in Baton Rouge, D
 Dudley A. Guglielmo, (1909-2005) Louisiana insurance commissioner from 1964 to 1972, D 
Rufus D. Hayes (1913-2002), first state insurance commissioner, former East Baton Rouge Parish district attorney and judge, former state Democratic chairman, D
 Betty Heitman, co-chairwoman of the Republican National Committee from 1983 to 1987; resided in and died in 1994 in Baton Rouge, R
 Kip Holden, Mayor-President of East Baton Rouge Parish (b. 1952), D 
 Barry Ivey (b. 1979), businessman and current member of the Louisiana House from District 65 (b. 1979), R 
 Alphonse J. Jackson (1927-2014), state representative from Caddo Parish, 1972–1992; operated public relations firm in Baton Rouge after leaving the legislature; died in and buried in Baton Rouge, D 
 Edward C. James (b. 1981), member of the Louisiana House of Representatives for East Baton Rouge Parish since 2012, D
Louis E. "Woody" Jenkins (b. 1947), former Louisiana state representative and three-time U.S. Senate candidate, D-turned-R 
 Bobby Jindal (b. 1971), Governor and Louisiana congressman, R 
 Johnnie Jones (Civil Rights) (b. 1920), member of the Louisiana House between 1972 and 1976.
 Edmond Jordan (b. 1971), member of the Louisiana House since 2016 for District 29 in West and East Baton Rouge parishes 
Edith Killgore Kirkpatrick (b. 1918), former member of Louisiana Board of Regents, D
Jeannette Knoll (b. 1943), associate justice of the Louisiana Supreme Court; born in Baton Rouge, resident of Marksville, D
Fred S. LeBlanc, mayor of Baton Rouge (1941-1944), state attorney general (1944-1948; 1952–1956), D
Coleman Lindsey (1892-1968), state senator, lieutenant governor, state district court judge, D 
John Maginnis (1948-2014), Louisiana political journalist, author, and commentator; reared and resided in Baton Rouge
 Robert M. Marionneaux (b. 1968), attorney and state senator, D 
 Sidney McCrory (1911-1985), entomologist who served as state agriculture commissioner from 1956 to 1960, D
Eugene McGehee (1928-2014), member of the Louisiana House of Representatives, 1960–1972; state district court judge in East Baton Rouge Parish, 1972–1978, D 
 Nolan Mettetal (1945-2020), Mississippi state representative
Henson Moore, U.S. representative from Sixth Congressional District, 1975–1987, R
 W. Spencer Myrick, state legislator from West Carroll Parish, later resided in Baton Rouge, D
 J. Kelly Nix (b. 1934), Baton Rouge businessman since 1984; Louisiana superintendent of education, 1976 to 1984, D
 Bob Odom (1935-2014), state agriculture commissioner, 1980–2008, D
Kenneth Osterberger (b. 1930), member of the Louisiana State Senate from East Baton Rouge Parish, 1972–1992; defeated David Duke in 1975, D-turned-R
 Jessel Ourso, colorful, controversial sheriff of Iberville Parish, began his career in law enforcement in the middle 1950s as a Baton Rouge municipal police officer, D.
 John Victor Parker (1928-2014), judge of the United States District Court for the Middle District of Louisiana, 1979-2014
Edward Grady Partin (1924-1990), Teamsters Union figure, D
 Tony Perkins (b. 1963), former state representative and president of the Family Research Council, R
 Ralph Perlman, Louisiana state budget director, 1967-1988
 Melvin Rambin, mayor of Monroe from 2000 to 2001; former banker in Baton Rouge, interred at Roselawn Memorial Park in Baton Rouge, R
Buddy Roemer, former governor and Baton Rouge businessman (b. 1943), I
Sean Reilly, state representative from 1988 to 1996 and current chief operations officer of Lamar Advertising, D
Buddy Roemer, former governor of Louisiana; resides in Baton Rouge, R
 Frank P. Simoneaux, member of the Louisiana House of Representatives for East Baton Rouge Parish, 1972–1982; lawyer in Baton Rouge, D
Patricia Haynes Smith, state representative for District 67 in East Baton Rouge Parish since 2008
 Mason Spencer, state representative from Madison Parish from 1924 to 1936, born in Baton Rouge in 1892, D
 Raymond Strother, political consultant, lived in Baton Rouge from 1960 to 1980, D
 Zachary Taylor, military leader and the twelfth President of the United States(1784–1850), W 
 David Treen, former Louisiana governor (1928-2009), was born in Baton Rouge, R 
Lillian W. Walker, former state representative (1964-1972), D
 Gus Weill, public relations consultant, author, television host, D 
 Mack A. "Bodi" White Jr., state representative since 2004, R 
 John C. White, Louisiana education superintendent since 2012, I
 J. Robert Wooley, insurance commissioner from 2000 to 2006; attorney with Adams & Reese in Baton Rouge, D

Military commanders
 Robert H. Barrow, 27th Commandant of the Marine Corps from 1979 to 1983 (b. 1922)
 Stephen O. Fuqua, Major general who served as U.S. Army Chief of Infantry
Russel Honoré, general, U.S. Army, known for Hurricane Katrina relief
 Junius Wallace Jones, major-general, U.S. Air Force, first Inspector-General of the Air Force (1890-1977)
 John A. Lejeune, 13th Commandant of the Marine Corps from 1920 to 1929 (1867-1942)

Intellectuals
 Louis Berry (1914-1998), civil rights attorney and dean of Southern University Law Center from 1972 to 1974
 David French Boyd (1834-1899), former president and professor at LSU 
 John R. Conniff, New Orleans and Baton Rouge educator who served as president of Louisiana Tech University from 1926 to 1928
Edwin Adams Davis,  Louisiana historian
Mike Dunne (1949-2007), environmental reporter for the Morning Advocate
 John Guckenheimer, mathematician, Cornell University 
 Kaylee Hartung, CBS News correspondent (b. 1985) 
George Hilton Jones III (1924-2008), Rhodes scholar, author, historian, and professor of history
 Stephan Kinsella, American intellectual property lawyer and libertarian legal theorist (b. 1965)
 Charles H. Loeb, American journalist
 John L. Loos, historian 
 Robert "Bob" Mann, journalist, political historian, LSU scholar
 Mary Elizabeth Moore, Methodist theologian, author, and Boston University School of Theology dean
 Arthur T. Prescott (1863-1942), LSU administrator, founding president of Louisiana Tech University
Jesse N. Stone (1924-2001), president of the Southern University System, 1974–1985; civil rights attorney
 Eric Voegelin (1901-1985), political theorist and professor at LSU 
 Eugene Wigner, Nobel Prize-winning physicist and emeritus professor at Louisiana State University 
 Mary Bushnell Williams (1826-1891), American author, poet, translator
 T. Harry Williams, Pulitzer Prize-winning author and professor at LSU

Criminals
Larry S. Bankston (b. 1951), racketeer
Sean Vincent Gillis (b. 1962), serial killer
John Allen Muhammad (1960-2009), serial killer and one of the two D.C. Snipers
Gary Plauché (1945-2014), vigilante murderer
Barry Seal (1939-1986), drug trafficker for the Medellín Cartel

Other
Julie Cantrell (b. 1973), bestselling novelist and editor 
Isiah Carey (b. 1970), radio and television broadcast journalist and reporter, known for the "Reporter Goes Ghetto" YouTube video
Ralph Eggleston, animator at Pixar and director of the academy award-winning short film For the Birds
Yaser Esam Hamdi (b. 1980), captured while fighting in Afghanistan with the Taliban in 2001; known for the Supreme Court case Hamdi v. Rumsfeld
Todd Graves, entrepreneur and founder of Raising Cane's Chicken Fingers
Don Lemon, news anchor and journalist
Barry Seal, Medellín Cartel Drug Trafficker
Jimmy Swaggart (b. 1935), American Pentecostal televangelist, singer, pianist, pastor, author, and head of his eponymous named Bible college.
Matt Tullos (b. 1963), writer and minister 
Rani Whitfield, physician, broadcaster and author

References

External links
 Baton Rouge Digital Archive

 
Baton Rouge
Baton Rouge, Louisiana